Paul William Scott Anderson (born 4 March 1965) is an English filmmaker who regularly works in science fiction films and video game adaptations.

Anderson made his feature film debut with the British independent film Shopping (1994), and found commercial success with his second film, the Hollywood-produced Mortal Kombat (1995), based on the first couple of video games of the same name by Midway Games. He is best known as the creative voice behind the first six films of the Resident Evil film series (2002–2016), which stars Milla Jovovich (whom he married in 2009), and is based on the Capcom video game series of the same name. The series's first six films, of which Anderson directed four, have collectively grossed over $1 billion worldwide, making it the most commercially successful video game adaptation of all time. Other of Anderson's notable films are Event Horizon (1997), an initial critical and commercial disappointment that found renewed appreciation on home media; Alien vs. Predator (2004), based on the crossover concept of the same name between the Alien and Predator franchises; and Death Race (2008), a remake/prequel to 1975's Death Race 2000.

Anderson and producer Jeremy Bolt founded Impact Pictures in 1992, under which most of Anderson's films have been made.

Early life
Anderson was born in Wallsend, Northumberland, England. At the age of nine, he started making films with a Super-8 camera. After attending Newlands Preparatory School, Gosforth and Newcastle's Royal Grammar School, he became the youngest person ever to graduate from the University of Warwick, with a B.A. in film and literature.

Career
Anderson began his professional career as a writer on the British crime drama film comedy series El C.I.D., which ran for three series, from 1990 to 1992, and starred Alfred Molina in its first two. He met producer Jeremy Bolt and they founded Impact Pictures in 1992, looking to raise money for Anderson's feature film debut as director, from an action crime drama script of his own, called Shopping. After much trouble securing funding, Shopping, which stars Sean Pertwee, Jude Law (in his first feature film role) and Sadie Frost, was released in the United Kingdom in 1994. The censors of the British Board of Film Classification were not happy with the film's violence of and delayed its release for months. When it was eventually released, critics panned it and some cinemas decided to ban it for promoting an "irresponsible" outlook. In the United States it received only an edited, direct-to-video release two years later. Anderson credits Shopping for inspiring Channel Four Films, who had financed it, to also finance the more successful Shallow Grave and Trainspotting films by Danny Boyle, which in turn, he believes, made critics reassess his film in more positive light in later years, as one of the first in a new wave of British films concerning its youth. Shopping is Anderson's one and only British film, as he grew up watching American and mainland European movies, never imagining himself a British filmmaker. When Shopping was accepted in the Sundance Film Festival, American studios noticed its impressive look and style despite its relatively small $2 million budget, which led to opportunies in Hollywood for Anderson.

Mortal Kombat and commercial success
Anderson directed the fantasy martial arts video game adaptation Mortal Kombat in 1995. Using a script written by Kevin Droney, the film was based on the first entry in the video game franchise by Midway Games, Mortal Kombat, although elements and characters were borrowed from the original game's sequel, Mortal Kombat II. The film featured an ensemble cast, including Robin Shou as Liu Kang and Christopher Lambert as Raiden. Anderson became interested in the project because he often played the game at arcades. The production company decided to hire him based on the accomplished visual flair of Shopping, which was filmed on a very low budget. Anderson, who at the time knew nothing about visual effects or fight scenes, had to study every book on visual effects that he could find, and learned about filming the fight scenes while they were being shot, often consulting those who were experienced in fight choreography on set, such as Shou. The film underwent extensive reshoots in order to add additional fights based on feedback from test screenings, which were attended by fans of the video game franchise. The production company decided to release Mortal Kombat in August 1995, in the hope that the film would become a summer blockbuster. Previous video game adaptations, such as Super Mario Bros., Double Dragon, and Street Fighter had received particularly negative reviews; although Street Fighter was a commercial success, Double Dragon failed to break even, while Super Mario Bros. became a notorious box-office bomb. Mortal Kombat was better received by critics, who gave it a mixed to negative reception. Critics praised the atmosphere, visuals, and fighting sequences, but criticized the plot, dialogue, and acting. It fared better with audiences and fans of the video games, and scored a high A− on a CinemaScore poll. As a result, it spent three weeks as the highest-grossing film at the US box office, and earned over $122 million worldwide, produced on a budget of $18 million. It proved a major success for Anderson, and has been recognised one of the first financially successful film adaptations of a video game. Anderson and most cast members, including Lambert, declined to return for the sequel, Mortal Kombat: Annihilation, which, when released, was critically panned and underperformed at the box office.

Event Horizon, Soldier and The Sight
The success of Mortal Kombat gave Anderson free rein to choose his next project, the science fiction action film Soldier, written by Blade Runner screenwriter David Peoples. Peoples' script—and eventually the film itself—contains references to his work on Blade Runner, and can be considered to be taking place in the same universe, as a sidequel or standalone sequel of sorts. Kurt Russell became attached to star, but decided to take some time off to build up his body, as required by the role, which delayed the production. In the meantime, Anderson directed the 1997 science fiction horror film Event Horizon, written by Philip Eisner and starring Laurence Fishburne and Sam Neill. Despite praise for its visuals and production design, it was not well received by critics or audiences (D+ on a Cinemascore poll), and failed to break even, which Anderson blamed on a tight post-production schedule and studio-enforced cuts. It later sold well on home video and gained a small cult following. Plans to complete a director's cut restoring the deleted footage were abandoned when it was discovered that most of it had been lost or degraded. Soldier was eventually completed and released in 1998, but was a critical and commercial disaster, making less than $15 million in the US, on a budget of $60 million, and releasing straight-to-video in several other markets. Anderson has expressed his regret that the planned location shoots had to be changed to studio soundstages due to the El Niño hurricane, which ended up compromising the film's look. He also verbalized his disappointment with Warner Bros., whom he believes tried to market the film to the same male teen audience as Mortal Kombat, rather than to grown-up audiences, including women.

After his last two films' poor performances, Anderson was forced to put his planned remake of the cult film Death Race 2000 on hold, and he set about writing and directing the 2000 supernatural mystery drama TV film The Sight, starring Andrew McCarthy. It was meant as a pilot for a potential series, but despite achieving high ratings it was not picked up. Anderson made his earlier films as "Paul Anderson", the name he registered with the Directors Guild of America, but with The Sight he began crediting himself as "Paul W. S. Anderson", as filmmaker Paul Thomas Anderson had registered himself with the Writers Guild of America as "Paul Anderson", making it impossible for either of them to both write and direct films as "Paul Anderson".

Resident Evil, Alien vs. Predator and Death Race
Anderson returned to cinema screens in 2002 with Resident Evil, a science fiction action horror film loosely based on the Capcom video game series of the same name. Anderson came up with the idea of adapting the games after playing the first couple of them for days in his apartment. Because Constantin Film, who had acquired the rights to the series, were not willing to spend more money than they already had on failed attempts (including a script by George A. Romero), Anderson convinced them to write the script, titled The Undead, on spec. If they liked it, he would sell it to them as a Resident Evil film; if not, he would take it elsewhere and try to make it unrelated to the games. He saw the film as a prequel of sorts to the first game in the series, and as such did not include any of the games' characters, a fact criticized by fans. Instead, it stars Milla Jovovich as an original character, Alice. Jovovich is the only actor that reprised her role in all of the series' six films. In comparison to Anderson's previous two films, Resident Evil was produced on a moderate budget of $33 million and became a commercial success with a little over $100 million at the box office. It also performed strongly on home media. Critically, Resident Evil was not received well, although, similarly to Mortal Kombat, some reviews characterized it as one of the better attempts at adapting a video game. It received the "fair" rating of B by audiences on a Cinemascore poll. Its relative popularity made Capcom put homages to it in video games Resident Evil 4 and Resident Evil: The Umbrella Chronicles. Anderson did not direct, but he wrote, produced, and was otherwise heavily involved with the making of two sequels, Resident Evil: Apocalypse (2004) and Resident Evil: Extinction (2007), which completed the first of the eventual two trilogies of Resident Evil films. In these two sequels, Anderson began to introduce characters from the games, albeit in supporting roles compared to Alice. Both films received similarly negative reviews to the first, but were even bigger commercial successes.

Anderson's next project was Alien vs. Predator, based on the crossover concept of the same name of the Alien and Predator franchises, popularized by a series of Dark Horse comics and hinted at in Predator 2. A film version had been stuck in development hell for several years, despite the franchise's crossing into every other form of media, from books to comics to video games. Anderson directed the film from a script of his own, and it was released in 2004. It received negative reviews, and a B on a Cinemascore poll by audiences. It was a big commercial success, however, grossing somewhat over $170 million on a $60 budget. A sequel was made, Aliens vs. Predator: Requiem, in which Anderson was not involved, and which failed to match Anderson's film's commercial or even critical performance, a fact that Anderson has used to defend his film.

After completing Alien vs. Predator, Anderson resumed work on his planned remake of Death Race 2000, which was released as Death Race in 2008. The science fiction action thriller stars Jason Statham, and Anderson directed it based on his own screenplay. He refers to it as more of a prequel than a remake on the commentary of the home video releases. It received an average reception by critics, and scored a solid B+ on a Cinemascore poll. It grossed little over $75 million on a budget of $45 million, failing to prove a commercial success on the level of Anderson's previous two films. Anderson wrote and produced two straight-to-video prequels, Death Race 2 (2011) and Death Race 3: Inferno (2013), set before the events of the 2008 film. He later wrote and executive-produced Death Race: Beyond Anarchy (2018), a sequel to the first film. 

The Resident Evil productions were criticized for unsafe filming and using shell companies to avoid liability. During the filming of Resident Evil: The Final Chapter (2016), crew member Ricardo Cornelius died when he was caught beneath a Humvee sliding off of a rotating platform. Stunt-woman Olivia Jackson lost most of an arm and was partially paralyzed when she collided with a camera crane during the filming of a motorcycle stunt in rain and freezing conditions. It was determined that she was wearing inadequate safety equipment, and that the stunt's timing had been changed without her knowledge. During the filming of Resident Evil: Retribution (2012), twelve extras were hospitalized with leg, neck, and back wounds after falling from a collapsing high-wheeled platform.

Resident Evil, The Three Musketeers and Pompeii
In 2010, Anderson wrote and directed the first installment in a second trilogy of Resident Evil films, titled Resident Evil: Afterlife. The film continues the storyline from where that last one ended. Anderson envisioned the new trilogy as a way to make use of a new stylistic approach, using slow motion and 3D. Anderson filmed in native 3D, using the Sony F35 camera, mounted on the Fusion Camera System, which was previously used in Avatar. Despite negative reviews by critics, and a lukewarm B in a Cinemascore poll by audiences, the film grossed $300 million on a budget of $60 million, making over $150 million that the previously most successful film in the franchise, Resident Evil: Extinction.

Anderson's next film was the 2011 3D romantic action adventure film The Three Musketeers, from a screenplay by Andrew Davies and Alex Litvak based on the novel of the same name. Matthew Macfadyen, Ray Stevenson, Luke Evans and Logan Lerman respectively star as the characters from the novel Athos, Porthos, Aramis, and d'Artagnan, while Milla Jovovich plays Milady de Winter. Furthermore, Christoph Waltz stars as Cardinal Richelieu, Orlando Bloom plays the Duke of Buckingham and Mads Mikkelsen appears as Captain Rochefort. The film failed to impress critics who reviewed it negatively, and scored a B on a Cinemascore poll. Commercially it did not perform very well, grossing around $132–140 million on a reported budget that ranges between $75 and 90 million.

Anderson wrote and directed the fifth installment in the Resident Evil film franchise, Resident Evil: Retribution, in 2012. Anderson brought back several actors from the original trilogy of films to play alternate versions of their characters. The film received generally negative reviews, and a C+ on a Cinemascore poll, the series' lowest. Produced with a budget of $65 million, it grossed $240 million on the box office which is $60 million lower than the previous film's gross, but still overall larger than the grosses of each films of the original trilogy.

In 2014 his 3D historical disaster romance film named Pompeii was released. Inspired by the eruption of Mount Vesuvius in 79 that destroyed Pompeii, a city of the Roman Empire, the film was written by Janet Scott Batchler, Lee Batchler and Michael Robert Johnson and stars Kit Harington, Emily Browning, Carrie-Anne Moss, Adewale Akinnuoye-Agbaje, Jessica Lucas, with Jared Harris, and Kiefer Sutherland. The film was generally negatively received by critics, and was rated a B on a Cinemascore poll. Pompeii was a modest box office success on the box office, grossing $108–118 million on a reported budget between $80 and 100 million.

In late 2016 in Japan, and early 2017 in the rest of the world, Anderson's Resident Evil: The Final Chapter was released, which according to both him and Jovovich is the last Resident Evil film they will be involved with. Anderson designed the film "to come full circle", provide answers to some of the series' mysteries, and provide closure for the character of Alice. He decided to abandon the previous two films' stylistic approach of using slow motion in favor of a more fast and gritty feeling, and he also decided to convert the film in 3D in post, instead of filming with 3D cameras. His first daughter with Jovovich, Ever Gabo Anderson, was cast in a double role, as both a young version of Alice, and the character of Red Queen introduced in the original film. The film received average to negative reviews, slightly better than the previous installments, and more along the lines of the original film. It was rated B by audiences on a Cinemascore poll, which is the highest rating in the series, and shared with the first and second films. The film grossed $312 million, on a budget of $40 million, in large part due to a record $94.3 million opening in China, making it Anderson's highest-grossing film.

Monster Hunter 
In December 2020, Anderson directed Monster Hunter, based on Capcom's Monster Hunter video-game franchise. It was released in December 2020 following delays relating to the COVID-19 pandemic, leading to a disappointing gross of $43 million against a $60 million budget. It received negative reviews.

Future projects
Anderson is set to write and direct an adaptation of George R.R. Martin's short story, In The Lost Lands. Peter V. Brett's fantasy novel The Warded Man was optioned for film production by Anderson and longtime producing partner Jeremy Bolt, but a 2016 update of Brett's website stated that they were no longer involved in the project.

Personal life

Anderson began dating Resident Evil star Milla Jovovich in 2002 after the film. He proposed to her in 2003, and they were "engaged on-and-off for four years" before becoming a couple again early in 2007. On 3 November 2007, Jovovich gave birth to their first child, daughter Ever Anderson, in Los Angeles, California. They married on 22 August 2009. Their second child, a daughter was born in April 2015. In August 2019, Jovovich revealed that they were expecting a third daughter after losing her pregnancy two years prior. Their third daughter was born in February 2020.

Filmography

Film

Also cameo appearance in The Shot (short film, 2011).

Producer
The Dark (2005)
 DOA: Dead or Alive (2006)
 Pandorum (2009)

Executive producer
 Here Are the Young Men (2020)
 Resident Evil: Welcome to Raccoon City (2021)

Direct-to-video

Television

Commercial 
Doom 3 "Warnings" (2005).
Volkswagen "Bus", "Chase", "Explosion" (2014).

Reception
Critical reception to Anderson's films has been negative. While Mortal Kombat and some of the Resident Evil films commonly feature on lists about the best film adaptations of video games, such lists mention that films of the genre are, at best, lackluster. Anderson has repeatedly stated he considers himself a "populist filmmaker", who only cares about whether his movies entertain the audience and make them cheer in the cinema, rather than their reception by professional critics.

References

External links

 
 
 Paul Anderson at The Numbers
 Paul WS Anderson interview on TheCinemaSource for Resident Evil: Afterlife

1965 births
Living people
20th-century English male writers
20th-century English screenwriters
21st-century English male writers
Action film directors
Alumni of the University of Warwick
British film production company founders
English expatriates in the United States
English film directors
English film producers
English male screenwriters
English television directors
English television producers
English television writers
English-language film directors
Horror film directors
People educated at the Royal Grammar School, Newcastle upon Tyne
People from Wallsend
Writers from Newcastle upon Tyne